Shales  is a surname. Notable people with the surname include: 

Brian Shales (born 1985), Canadian pair skater
Tom Shales (born 1944), American writer and critic

See also
Scales (surname)
Shale (surname)
Shames (surname)